The Multi Fibre Arrangement (MFA) governed the world trade in textiles and garments from 1974 through 1994, imposing quotas on the amount developing countries could export to developed countries. Its successor, the Agreement on Textiles and Clothing (ATC), expired on 1 January 2005.

History

Since the (re)emergence of developing countries as a source of cotton textile production, after the Textile manufacture during the Industrial Revolution, such as India, Bangladesh, and Pakistan's Khadi production in the Swadeshi movement initiated by Mahatma Gandhi, cotton production from these countries steadily increased after colonial independence.  A number of treaties concerning Short-Term Arrangements regarding International Trade in Cotton Textiles (Geneva, 21 July 1961); Long-Term Arrangement regarding International Trade in Cotton Textiles  (Geneva, 9 February 1962 and 15 June 1970), and Arrangement regarding International Trade in Textiles (Geneva, 20 December 1973) attempted to address the issue of what seemed a natural dominance of developing world in cotton textile production at the time.  Eventually, the Multi Fibre Agreement was established in 1974.

Impact
The MFA was introduced in 1974 as a short-term measure intended to allow developed countries to adjust to imports from the developing world. Developing countries and countries without a welfare state have a comparative advantage in textile production because it is labor-intensive and their poor social insurance systems allow them low labor costs. According to a World Bank/International Monetary Fund (IMF) study, the system has cost the developing world 27 million jobs and $40 billion a year in lost exports. Developing countries have resisted moves such as a social clause in tariff agreements, to link them to improvements in working conditions.

The Arrangement was not negative for all developing countries. For example, the European Union (EU) imposed no restrictions or duties on imports from the emerging countries, such as Bangladesh, leading to a massive expansion of the industry.

At the General Agreement on Tariffs and Trade (GATT) Uruguay Round, it was decided to bring the textile trade under the jurisdiction of the World Trade Organization. The Agreement on Textiles and Clothing provided for the gradual dismantling of the quotas that existed under the MFA. This process was completed on 1 January 2005. However, large tariffs remained in place on many textile products.

Bangladesh was expected to suffer the most from the ending of the MFA, as it was expected to face more competition, particularly from China. However, this was not the case. It turns out that even in the face of other economic giants, Bangladesh's labor is "cheaper than anywhere else in the world." While some smaller factories were documented making pay cuts and layoffs, most downsizing was essentially speculative – the orders for goods kept coming even after the MFA expired. In fact, Bangladesh's exports increased in value by about $500 million in 2006.

However, poorer countries within the developed world, such as Greece and Portugal, are expected to lose out.

During early 2005, textile and clothing exports from China to the West grew by 100% or more in many items, leading the US and EU to cite China's WTO accession agreement allowing them to restrict the rate of growth to 7.5% per year until 2008. In June, China agreed with the EU to limit the rate to 10% for 3 years. No such agreement was reached with the US, which imposed its own import growth quotas of 7.5% instead.

When the EU announced their new quotas to replace the lapsed MFA, Chinese manufacturers accelerated their shipping of the goods intended for the European market. This used up a full year's quota almost immediately.  As a result, 75 million items of imported Chinese garments were held in European ports in August 2005. A diplomatic resolution was reached at the beginning of September 2005 during Tony Blair's visit to China, putting an end to a situation the UK press had dubbed "Bra Wars".

See also
 Quota Elimination
 Outward Processing Arrangement

References

External links
 BBC News Online: EU warns China on textile exports, 24 April 2005
 New York Times: China to Limit Textile Exports to Europe, 11 June 2005
 BBC News Online: EU and China reach textile deal, 5 September 2005
 Dollars & Sense: Falling Off a Cliff: Millions of garment workers worldwide stand to lose their jobs with this year's changes in global textile trade rules September/October 2005
 As regards the EU-China trade relations, see Paolo Farah (2006) Five Years of China’s WTO Membership. EU and US Perspectives about China’s Compliance with Transparency Commitments and the Transitional Review Mechanism, Legal Issues of Economic Integration, Kluwer Law International, Volume 33, Number 3, pp. 263–304.
Text of MFA from Stanford GATT Archive
Text of MFA plus subsequent amendments etc from GATT Archive
MultifibRearrangement BA Thesis Blog

History of international trade
Foreign relations of the European Union
Textile industry
International trade organizations